Centaurea aspera, the rough star-thistle, is a species of Centaurea found in Europe and in New York, United States.

References

External links

aspera